Streetwise is a 1984 documentary film by director Martin Bell chronicling the lives of homeless youth on the streets of Seattle. It followed in the wake of a July 1983 Life magazine article, "Streets of the Lost", by writer Cheryl McCall and photographer Mary Ellen Mark(Bell's wife).

Synopsis 
Streetwise portrays the lives of nine desperate teenagers. Thrown too young into a seedy, grown-up world, these runaways and castaways survive, but just barely. Rat, the dumpster diver; Tiny, the teenage prostitute; Shellie, the baby-faced one; and DeWayne, the hustler, are all old beyond their years. All are underage survivors fighting for life and love on the streets of downtown Seattle, Washington.

Production
According to Mark's accompanying 1985 book, also titled Streetwise, McCall and Mark traveled to Seattle, Washington specifically to reveal that even in a town that billed itself as America's most livable city, there still existed rampant homelessness and desperation. After making connections with several homeless youth during the writing of the article, Mark convinced Bell that the youth were worthy of his making a documentary based on their lives. McCall and Mark were also instrumental in making the film, which was funded by singer Willie Nelson. Streetwise follows the lives of several homeless teenagers, although it focuses most on 14-year-old Erin Blackwell, a young prostitute who goes by the name of Tiny. Much of the time, Tiny stays at the home of her alcoholic mother, Pat, who seems unfazed by her daughter's prostitution, calling it a "phase".

Bell's follow-up documentary, named Streetwise: Tiny Revisited, was released in 2016.

Reception
Streetwise has received a score of 98% on Rotten Tomatoes. Writing for National Review, John Simon stated "Its  cumulative  effect is tremendous, but not quite the way you might think. It makes you very sad, but even more indignant; and it also makes you laugh a lot." In a pan for Time, Richard Schickel wrote "These glimpses into prematurely ruined lives are inescapably affecting. Yet there is something that is finally repellent about Streetwise."

Streetwise was nominated for an Academy Award for Best Documentary Feature

Home Media 
Streetwise was released on VHS by New World Video in 1986. The film was released on DVD and Blu-ray by The Criterion Collection on June 15, 2021.

Aftermath 
(Corresponds to the order of the cast list)

Roberta Joseph Hayes  Was last seen leaving to jail in Portland, Oregon.  After arriving back in Seattle she was picked up by Gary Ridgway.  Her strangled body was not found until Sept. 11, 1991.  Roberta became Green River Killer victim #44. 
Dewayne Pomeroy: As shown in the film, he hung himself the day before his 17th birthday in July 1984. Some of the street kids held a balloon release and planted a tree in Freeway Park in his memory. Plaque 21394 on the ground at the Pike Place Market says "Dewayne Pomeroy 1984". His story and relationship with his felon father was the inspiration for the 1992 film American Heart starring Jeff Bridges, with Edward Furlong playing Dewayne's part.
"Little Justin" Reed Early authored a book, Street Child: A Memoir, based on his experience as a homeless child and now works as an advocate for homeless youths.
Lou Ellen "Lulu" Couch was fatally stabbed by a man at an arcade on 1st and Pike Street in December 1985 at age 22 while trying to defend a girl who was being assaulted. Her last words were, "Tell Martin and Mary Ellen, Lulu died". Plaque 21393 on the ground at the Pike Place Market says "Lulu Couch 1985". Approximately 319 people attended her funeral. Surviving friends from the street raised funds to provide a headstone for Lulu's gravesite.
Patti died of HIV/AIDS in 1993 at age 27.
Rat is married with children and has grandchildren.
Shadow has worked as a carpenter and a security guard.
Erin Blackwell ("Tiny"): When Streetwise was nominated for a 1984 Academy Award for documentary, Tiny attended the Oscar ceremony with Bell and Mark. After that Tiny's life did not radically change tracks. Mark returned to Seattle to photograph Tiny many times since 1983, and photographs of Tiny have appeared in Mark's later books, which reveal that in the years after the Streetwise projects, Tiny continued her prostitution, became a drug addict, and gave birth to ten children fathered by several different men. In 1993, 10 years after the making of the film, she was featured in an ABC news program called Tiny's Story. In the mid-2000s, however, Mark and Bell's 23-minute film Erin revealed that Tiny had cleaned up and settled down with a husband and her minor children.
Patrice Pitts: Pitts - known best in the film for his argument with the street preacher - remained homeless after the filming and battled severe drug addiction. On January 29, 2017, Pitts was shot and killed in front of the St. Charles Hotel. Two individuals were later arrested for the murder of the 52-year-old Pitts.

Legacy
In March 2013 a Streetwise Facebook group was opened up in hopes of finding the children from the documentary. Almost all the main characters (and some minor characters) were found. The group has recent pictures of Rat, Munchkin, Tiny, Justin, Lillie and many others. There are also memorials set up for the kids who are deceased. Old videos and pictures of the kids were found and posted. As of 2015, over 1,700 fans and Streetwise alumni participate and post in the group. Both Martin Bell and Mary Ellen Mark (posthumously) commented that they greatly enjoyed seeing all the kids they filmed over 30 years ago.

Sequel 
On November 20, 2013, Mary Ellen Mark and Martin Bell launched the Streetwise: Tiny Revisited project on Kickstarter. The film, titled Tiny: The Life of Erin Blackwell, had its premiere at the 2016 Seattle International Film Festival. It focuses on the life of Tiny and her family over the 30+ years since Streetwise.

A new book was published in conjunction with the film. Streetwise: Tiny Revisited was published in the fall of 2015 by Aperture, and includes photos taken by Mark over 30 years of friendship with Tiny Blackwell.

In popular culture 
The character Rat's line "I love to fly. It's just, you're alone with peace and quiet, nothing around you but clear, blue sky. No one to hassle you. No one to tell you where to go or what to do. The only bad part about flying is having to come back down to the fucking world" is sampled in the song "Zap!" by The Avalanches (2016), as well as the songs "Say My Name or Say Whatever" by How to Dress Well (2012) and "Seducer" by Saraya (1991). Another excerpt of dialogue is sampled in the song "すばらしくてNice Choice" by Fishmans (1996).

References

External links
Mary Ellen Mark (official site)

 (official site of Justin Early)
 Trailer on Janus Films' Vimeo channel

1984 films
American documentary films
Documentary films about prostitution in the United States
Documentary films about Seattle
1984 documentary films
Documentary films about street children
Documentary films about homelessness in the United States
1980s English-language films
1980s American films